Sheffield City Council elections took place on Thursday 6 May 2010. There were 28 seats up for election in 2010, one of the three councillors from each ward. Since the previous election, Liberal Democrat councillor Frank Taylor had defected to an Independent leaving the Liberal Democrats with 44 councillors. Turnout was up dramatically with it being held alongside the general election, to 62.6%. The higher turnout helped mainly Labour against their electoral rivals, who managed to return the council to no overall control with three gains. This was bolstered by the newly elected Liberal Democrat in Walkley defecting to Labour immediately after being elected.

Election result

The Labour Party gained two seats from their position following the 2006 election, but also regained a seat lost to the Liberal Democrats through a double vacancy election in Mosborough.

This result had the following consequences for the total number of seats on the Council after the elections:

Ward results

Arbourthorne

Beauchief & Greenhill

Beighton

Birley

Broomhill

Bernard Little was a sitting councillor for Central ward.

Burngreave

Central

Crookes

Darnall

Dore & Totley

East Ecclesfield

Garry Weatherall was a sitting councillor for Gleadless Valley ward.

Ecclesall

Firth Park

Fulwood

Gleadless Valley

Graves Park

Hillsborough

Manor Castle

Mosborough

Mosborough was a regain for the Labour Party, after the Liberal Democrats had won a double vacancy election in 2008.

Nether Edge

Tim Rippon was a sitting councillor for Arbourthorne ward.

Richmond

Shiregreen & Brightside

Southey

Stannington

Stocksbridge & Upper Don

Walkley

West Ecclesfield

Woodhouse

By-elections between 2010 and 2011

References

2010 English local elections
May 2010 events in the United Kingdom
2010
2010s in Sheffield